The National Statistical Commission (NSC) of India is an autonomous body which formed in June 2005 under the recommendation of Rangarajan commission. The NSC is currently headed by Prof. Rajeeva Laxman Karandikar who was appointed as Chairperson of the Commission on 30 Nov 2022 for a period of three years. Dr. Kiran Pandya and Prof. Pulak Ghosh are other members of the Commission.  Amitabh Kant, ex. CEO of NITI Aayog is the ex-officio Member and Dr. G P Samanta, Chief Statistician of India and Secretary, Ministry of Statistics and Programme Implementation is Secretary to the Commission. The Chairperson of the Commission enjoys the status of a Minister of State and the Members of the Commission have the status equivalent to the Secretary to the Government of India. The Chairperson and the Members also enjoy a relative security of tenure as once they assume office, they can be removed only by the President after the Supreme Court of India has on inquiry held in accordance with the procedure Article 145 of the Constitution of India reported that they ought to be removed.

The objective of its constitution is to reduce the problems faced by statistical agencies in the country in relation to collection of data.

Statistical agencies like the Central Statistics Office (CSO) and the National Sample Survey Organisation (NSSO) face numerous problems in collecting data from State and Central government departments, but an autonomous body like the NSC is thought to be more able to coordinate things as a statutory status would lend it teeth.

It would lay special emphasis on ensuring collection of unbiased data so as to restore public trust in the figures released by the Government.

Present Composition
Present members of the NSC (as on 31 July 2019):

Chief Statistician of India 

 Pronab Sen – First Chief Statistician of India
 T C A Anant
 Pravin Srivastava
Dr.G.P.Samanta

References

Indian commissions and inquiries
Statistical organisations in India
Commissions in India
2006 establishments in Delhi
Government agencies established in 2006